Four ships of the Royal Australian Navy been named HMAS Parramatta, for the Parramatta River. The name comes from the Barramattagal people (burra meaning eel and matta meaning creek).

 , a River-class destroyer commissioned in 1910, paid off in 1928, and sold for scrap
 , a River-class destroyer escort commissioned in 1961 and decommissioned in 1991
 , an Anzac-class frigate commissioned in 2003 and active as of 2016

Battle honours
Ships named HMAS Parramatta are entitled to carry four battle honours:
Rabaul 1914
Adriatic 1917–18
Libya 1941
Malaysia 1964–66

References

Royal Australian Navy ship names